Luce Mongrain  (born 1 November 1971) is a Canadian soccer player who played as a defender for the Canada women's national soccer team. She was part of the team at the 1995 FIFA Women's World Cup.

Honours 
 2021: Canada Soccer Hall of Fame

References

External links
 
 / Canada Soccer Hall of Fame

1971 births
Living people
Canadian women's soccer players
Canada women's international soccer players
Soccer people from Quebec
Sportspeople from Trois-Rivières
1995 FIFA Women's World Cup players
Women's association football defenders